Fever Dream is a 2021 psychological thriller film directed by Claudia Llosa from a screenplay that she co-wrote with Samanta Schweblin, based on Schweblin's 2014 novel of the same name. The film stars María Valverde, Dolores Fonzi, German Palacios, Guillermo Pfening and Emilio Vodanovich.

The film had its world premiere at the 69th San Sebastián International Film Festival on September 20, 2021. It was released in select theaters in the United States on October 6, 2021, and on Netflix on October 13, 2021.

Cast
 María Valverde as Amanda
 Dolores Fonzi as Carola
 German Palacios as Omar
 Guillermo Pfening as Marco
 Emilio Vodanovich as David
 Guillermina Sorribes Liotta as Nina
 Marcelo Michinaux as David
 Cristina Banegas

Production
In December 2018, Netflix announced that it would produce a film version of the novel Fever Dream by Samanta Schweblin and directed by the Peruvian director Claudia Llosa. Filming, by the production companies Gran Via Productions and Fábula, began in Chile in early 2019.

Reception
On Rotten Tomatoes, the film holds an approval rating of 72% based on 39 reviews, with an average rating of 6.5/10. The site's critics consensus reads: "The meaning of this alluring drama can feel as elusive as a Fever Dream, but it's steadily absorbing and consistently difficult to look away." On Metacritic, the film has a weighted average score of 75 out of 100, based on 9 critics, indicating "generally favorable reviews".

References

External links
 
 

2021 films
2021 psychological thriller films
2021 thriller drama films
Films directed by Claudia Llosa
American psychological thriller films
Chilean thriller drama films
Peruvian psychological thriller films
American thriller drama films
Films based on Argentine novels
Films based on horror novels
Films based on thriller novels
Spanish thriller drama films
Spanish-language Netflix original films
2020s Peruvian films
2020s Chilean films
2020s Spanish films
2020s American films
Spanish psychological thriller films